Prada is an Italian fashion company.

Prada may also refer to:

Prada by Prada
LG Prada, 1 (KE850), a mobile phone designed by Prada and manufactured by LG Electronics
LG Prada II (KF900), a mobile phone designed by Prada and manufactured by LG Electronics
LG Prada 3.0 (P940), a mobile phone designed by Prada and manufactured by LG Electronics
Prada Challenge, an America's Cup yachting syndicate sponsored by Prada whose boats are also referred to as "Prada Challenge" or "Prada"
Prada Transformer, the Prada building in Seoul, South Korea
Fondazione Prada, an art and culture foundation in Italy

Places
Prada de Conflent, Catalan name for Prades, Pyrénées-Orientales, Languedoc-Roussillon, France
Prada (Poschiavo), Val Poschiavo, Grisons, Switzerland
Château du Prada (built 1764), a chateau in Aquitane, France

People
Adolfo Prada (1883–1962), Spanish army officer
Ágatha Ruiz de la Prada (born 1960), Spanish fashion designer
Alberto Prada (born 1989), Spanish footballer
Ana Prada (born 1971), Uruguayan singer-songwriter
Bruno Prada (born 1971), Brazilian sailor
Carlos Prada Sanmiguel (1939–2013), Colombian priest
Federico Richter Fernandez-Prada (1922–2011), Peruvian priest
Gustavo Baz Prada (1894–1987), Mexican politician
Inés Del Río Prada (born 1958), Spanish terrorist
Jaya Prada (born 1962), Indian film actress and politician
Jean Carlos Prada (born 1984), Venezuelan welterweight boxer
Jesús Capitán Prada (born 1977), Spanish footballer
Joaquín Prada (born 1991), Uruguayan rugby footballer
José María Prada (1925–1978), Spanish actor
Judas Prada, American basketball coach
Manuel González Prada (1844–1918), Peruvian politician
Mara Prada (fl. 2010s), Columbia singer on "Crazy Love" with Beto Pérez
Mario Prada (died 1958), Italian fashion designer and founder of PRADA
Michel Prada (born 1940), French lawyer
Miuccia Prada (born 1949), Italian fashion designer and part of PRADA
Pedro Richter Prada (1921–2017), Peruvian politician
Pedro Pablo Prada Quintero, Cuban diplomat
Raúl Prada, Bolivian philosopher
Renato Prada Oropeza (1937–2011), Bolivian-Mexican scientist
Silvia Prada (born 1969), Spanish artist

Other uses
Prada (skipper), a genus of butterflies
Prada Elementary School, Webb County, Texas, USA

See also

The Devil Wears Prada (disambiguation)
Pradal serey, a Khmer form of kickboxing
Prado, an art museum in Madrid, Spain
Prade, Littoral, Slovenia